Inowrocław Synagogue was one of two synagogues in Inowrocław, Poland. The structure was built in 1908, with funds provided almost entirely by Leopold Levy. After Nazi Germany's invasion of Poland in 1939, the Nazis attempted to turn it into a bathhouse or swimming pool, but were unable to so they destroyed it. Today, the site of the building is occupied by a statue of Polish literary figure Jan Kasprowicz, who was born on the outskirts of the city in the village of Szymborze. The site of the synagogue has recently been renamed Skwer Jan-Paweł II (John-Paul II Square). The other synagogue was in Ulica Rzeźnicka, it is not known when it was demolished but it is believed some time in the 1980s, and a private house now stands there.

See also
Inowrocław

References

Former Reform synagogues in Poland
Synagogues completed in 1908
Synagogues destroyed by Nazi Germany
Buildings and structures in Kuyavian-Pomeranian Voivodeship
Inowrocław County
Holocaust locations in Poland
20th-century religious buildings and structures in Poland